The Tochquonyalla Range is a subrange of the Tahtsa Ranges, located east of the Gamsby River and west of Lindquist Lake in northern British Columbia, Canada.

References

Tochquonyalla Range in the Canadian Mountain Encyclopedia

Hazelton Mountains